Guerrilla warfare is irregular warfare and combat.

Guerrilla Warfare or Guerrilla War may also refer to:

Guerrilla Warfare (book), a 1961 book by Che Guevara
Guerrilla Warfare (album), a 1999 musical album by Hot Boys
Guerrilla War (video game), a 1987 run and gun video game

See also
Guerrilla (disambiguation)
Gorilla Warfare (disambiguation)